Saint Augustine Chapel and Cemetery is a historic church on Dorchester Street between West Sixth and Tudor Streets in the South Boston neighborhood of Boston, Massachusetts.  Built in 1818–19, it is the oldest Roman Catholic church building in Massachusetts; the cemetery, established 1818 is also the state's oldest Catholic cemetery.  The Gothic Revival chapel was originally built as a crypt for the remains of Father François Matignon, the first Catholic priest to come to Boston from France. Father Dennis J. O'Donovan is also buried there.

The chapel and cemetery were listed on the National Register of Historic Places in 1987.  The chapel is still in active, holding 4pm Mass on Saturdays.

See also
 List of cemeteries in Boston, Massachusetts
 National Register of Historic Places listings in southern Boston, Massachusetts

References

External links 

 

Roman Catholic churches completed in 1818
Roman Catholic churches in Boston
Roman Catholic cemeteries in Massachusetts
Cemeteries in South Boston
South Boston
National Register of Historic Places in Boston
Historic districts on the National Register of Historic Places in Massachusetts
19th-century Roman Catholic church buildings in the United States